Baie Verte-Green Bay (formerly Baie Verte-Springdale) is a provincial electoral district for the House of Assembly of Newfoundland and Labrador, Canada. As of 2011 it has 8,067 eligible voters. The district was redistributed in 2015.

It contains the communities of: Baie Verte, Beachside, Brent's Cove, Brighton, Burlington, Coachman's Cove, Fleur de Lys, King's Point, LaScie, Little Bay, Little Bay Islands, Lushes Bight-Beaumont-Beaumont North, Middle Arm, Miles Cove, Ming's Bight, Nippers Harbour, Pacquet, Pilley's Island, Port Anson, Robert's Arm, Seal Cove, South Brook, Springdale, Tilt Cove, Triton, Westport, Woodstock, Harbour Round, Purbeck's Cove, Wild Cove, Sheppardville, St. Patricks, Round Harbour, Shoe Cove, Smith's Harbour, Snooks Arm, Harry's Harbour, Jackson's Cove-Langdon's Cove, Silverdale, and Rattling Brook.

The economy depends heavily on fishing and sealing. While sealing has done well in recent years, the ground fishery remains poor. Mining operations are taking place in Baie Verte and King's Point, and mineral exploration continues in the area.

The district has voted Progressive Conservative since 1982, with the exception of a by-election and the 2015 and 2019 elections. The district's borders shifted slightly south and west in the new redistribution, taking in small parts of the Humber Valley and the former Grand Falls-Buchans districts.

Members of the House of Assembly
The district has elected the following Members of the House of Assembly:

Election results

Results as Baie Verte

|-

|-

|-

|Independent
|William Day
|align="right"|114 
|align="right"|2.78
|align="right"|+2.78
|-
!align="left" colspan=3|Total
!align="right"|
!align="right"|
!align="right"|
|}

|-

|-

|}

|-

|-

|}

External links
The Newfoundland and Labrador House of Assembly

References

Newfoundland and Labrador provincial electoral districts